Never Goin' Back is a 2018 American stoner comedy written, directed, and edited by Augustine Frizzell.

It stars Maia Mitchell and Camila Morrone as two broke teenage waitresses who stumble through a series of misadventures as they try to get away for a vacation to Galveston.

The film had its world premiere at the Sundance Film Festival on January 22, 2018. It was released on August 3, 2018, by A24.

Plot

In southern Texas, Angela and Jessie are best friends and high school dropouts who spend their time working as waitresses at a mundane restaurant and wanting more out of their lives. One day, Angela decides to surprise Jessie by purchasing a trip to Galveston so they can spend Jessie's birthday at the beach. She uses their rent money to pay for it and arranges for both of them to do extra hours at the restaurant to make up for the money they spent on the trip. However, Dustin, Jessie's goofy older brother and both girls' roommate, spends his part of the rent in a failed drug sale he attempted with his friends. The next morning Tony, Dustin's friend, breaks into the house and steals an old TV because he thinks Dustin stole the drug money. The police arrive to check the scene of the crime and discover Angela's and Jessie's stash of weed and cocaine. Both girls are arrested.

After spending two days in juvenile detention, where Jessie suffers from constipation, the girls are released and learn that Roderick, their boss, wants to talk to them. While headed to the laundry to wash their uniforms, they meet an ex-co-worker, Paul, who tells them that their mutual friend Art Dog is having a party at his home and that they can use his washing machine. At Art Dog's house, the girls try to remain sober, but they eat cannabis cookies by accident. They arrive high at their job and Roderick, even though he cares for both of them, makes the tough decision to fire them.

With all hope lost, Jessie comes up with the idea of convincing Brandon, their other, porn-addicted roommate, to let them take the money from the cash register at the sandwich shop where he works and then tell the police he was robbed. At first Brandon doesn't like the idea but he accepts when the girls promise to have a threesome with him, a promise they do not intend to keep. At that moment, a disguised Dustin and his other friend, Ryan, enter and try to steal the money in order to recover what they lost in the drug deal. The girls immediately recognize them and they admit to Brandon they don't have enough money to pay for rent. After the boys leave, a terrified Brandon admits that there is only $50 in the register and that the rest is in a safe he does not have the key for.

Brandon's boss, Mr. Dickson, unexpectedly arrives and Brandon hides the girls in the utility closet. Dickson makes Brandon leave, leaving Angela and Jessie trapped inside. Mr. Dickson then puts his penis inside of a sandwich bread and takes pictures of it, as the girls realize that he is an old man that they yelled at for being sexist at a grocery store. Suddenly Jessie starts having cramps due to the long constipation and defecates in a bucket. Angela, feeling disgust, opens the closet door and vomits on Mr. Dickson, who passes out on the floor. Relieved that he is still alive, the girls check his phone and find out he is "sexting" with a woman who is not his wife. They decide to use his key to open the safe and take the money and leave a message for him telling they will show the pictures to his wife if he reports them to the police.

Back in the house, where Brandon, Dustin, Ryan and Tony are all deeply sleeping, Angela and Jessie decide to leave them enough money to pay the rent and take the rest and go to California to start a new life. While they are talking about their plans, they fall asleep in their bed. The movie ends with a scene of Angela and Jessie having fun at the beach.

Cast
 Maia Mitchell as Angela
 Camila Morrone as Jessie
 Joel Allen as Dustin
 Kendal Smith as Tony
 Matthew Holcomb as Ryan
 Kyle Mooney as Brandon
 Atheena Frizzell as Crystal

Release
The film had its world premiere at the Sundance Film Festival on January 22, 2018. Shortly after, A24 acquired distribution rights to the film. It also screened at South by Southwest on March 10, 2018. It was released on August 3, 2018.

Reception
Never Goin' Back received positive reviews from film critics. The website's critical consensus reads, "Never Goin' Back benefits from the chemistry between leads Maia Mitchell and Camila Morrone, whose easy rapport lifts a coming-of-age story with uncommon insight." Metacritic gives the film a weighted average rating of 62 out of 100, based on 19 critics, indicating "generally favorable reviews".

References

External links
 
 

2018 films
2010s coming-of-age comedy-drama films
2018 independent films
2010s teen comedy-drama films
A24 (company) films
American coming-of-age comedy-drama films
American female buddy films
American independent films
American teen comedy-drama films
2018 comedy-drama films
Films directed by Augustine Frizzell
2010s female buddy films
2010s English-language films
2010s American films